Oleh Borovyk (born 13 August 1996) is a Ukrainian sprint canoer. He is a silver medalists of the 2018 World Championships and silver medalist of the 2018 European Championships.

References

1996 births
Ukrainian male canoeists
Living people
ICF Canoe Sprint World Championships medalists in Canadian
Sportspeople from Poltava
European Games competitors for Ukraine
Canoeists at the 2019 European Games
21st-century Ukrainian people